The discography of American rapper King Von consists of two studio albums, two mixtapes, and nineteen singles (including four as a featured artist).

Albums

Studio albums

Posthumous albums

Compilation albums

Mixtapes

Singles

As a lead artist

As a featured artist

Other charted and certified songs

Notes

References

Hip hop discographies
Discographies of American artists